The following lists events that happened during 1845 in Chile.

Incumbents
President of Chile: Manuel Bulnes

Events

Births
date unknown - Elías Fernandez Albano
19 March - Ramón Allende Padín (died 1884)
26 April - Jorge Montt Montt 
17 May - Pedro Lira Rencoret (died 1912)
13 October - Federico Santa María (died 1925)

Deaths
16 March - Manuel Rengifo (born 1793)

References 

 
1840s in Chile
Chile
Chile